ROKS Sung In Bong (LST-685) is a  in the Republic of Korea Navy.

Construction and commissioning 
The ship was launched in 1996 by Hanjin Heavy Industries at Busan and commissioned into the Navy in 1999.

On 3 February 2010, she and HTMS Surin transits the Gulf of Thailand during an exercise with the USS Harpers Ferry (LSD-49).

References

Ships built by Hanjin Heavy Industries
Go Jun Bong-class tank landing ships
1996 ships